The 2021 European BMX Championships will be held from 9 to 11 July 2021 in Heusden-Zolder, Belgium.

Medal summary

References

European BMX Championships
European Championships
2021 in Belgian sport
International sports competitions hosted by Belgium
Cycle racing in Belgium
Heusden-Zolder
European BMX Championships